Litjotjela is a community council located in the Leribe District of Lesotho. Its population in 2006 was 21,383.

Villages
The community of Litjotjela includes the villages of Bothoba-Pelo, Ha Eti (Linotšing), Ha Hoki, Ha Jane (Boinyatso), Ha Lechesa, Ha Lesala, Ha Leshoele, Ha Leshoele (Likhakeng), Ha Lesitsi (Likhakeng), Ha Letuka (Matukeng), Ha Libe, Ha Mahlehle (Likhakeng), Ha Mahlomola (Likhakeng), Ha Malimatle (Matukeng), Ha Masaleng (Ha Mokokoana), Ha Mohlolo (Ha Molupe), Ha Mojapela, Ha Mojela ('Muela), Ha Mokokoana, Ha Morolong ('Muela), Ha Morolong (Likhakeng), Ha Motetepa, Ha Mpopo, Ha Nthako, Ha Ntholi, Ha Nyarela (Tsikoane), Ha Peete, Ha Pitere, Ha Potloane (Tsikoane), Ha Potso (Lipelaneng), Ha Qokolo, Ha Ramoloi (Linotšing), Ha Ranku (Mapheaneng), Ha Sebe, Ha Sekoto, Ha Setenane (Phatlalla), Ha Setho ('Muela), Ha Tšaba-Lira, Ha Tšupane, Hloahloeng, Hloahloeng (Ha Poulo), Lenyakoane, Leqhutsung (Moreneng), Leralleng, Linotsing (Ha Mokokoana), Maebeng, Mahlabatheng, Majakaneng, Mankhololi, Masieeng, Matjelong (Ha Mohale), Matsoapong (Matukeng), Matukeng, Ramosenyehi, Seqhobong, Tsekong and Tsikoane.

References

External links
 Google map of community villages

Populated places in Leribe District